Seliamedu is a village, sub-taluk in Bahour Commune of Bahour taluk  in the Union Territory of Puducherry, India. It lies on north side in the Bahour Enclave of Puducherry district.

Geography
Seliamedu is bordered by  Bahour in the west, Keezh Kumaramangalam village of Tamil nadu in the north, Nagappanur village of Tamil nadu in east and Kudiyiruppupalayam in the south.

Road Network
Seliamedu lies on Villianur - Bahour road (RC-18). Seliamedu is also connected by TN Palayam-Bahour road.

Villages
Following are the list of villages under Seliamedu Village Panchayat.

 Seliamedu
 Aranganur

Gallery

Politics
Seliamedu is  a part of Embalam (Union Territory Assembly constituency) which comes under Puducherry (Lok Sabha constituency)

References

External links
Official website of the Government of the Union Territory of Puducherry

Villages in Puducherry district